Wilhelm Heinrich, Duke of Saxe-Eisenach (10 November 1691 – 26 July 1741), was a duke of Saxe-Eisenach.

He was born in Oranjewoud, the eldest and only surviving son of Johann Wilhelm, Duke of Saxe-Eisenach and his first wife Amalie of Nassau-Dietz.

Wilhelm Heinrich first married Albertine Juliane of Nassau-Idstein (daughter George August, Count of Nassau-Idstein) in Idstein on 15 February 1713. This marriage was childless. He married his second wife Anna Sophie Charlotte of Brandenburg-Schwedt in Berlin on 3 June 1723, just eight months after the death of Albertine Juliane. The second marriage was also childless.

From 1730 to 1741, Johann Adam Birkenstock served the director of music and the leader of the court orchestra, a position referred to as the Kapellmeister. However the court Kapelle (chapel choir) was disbanded after Wilehlm Heinrich's death in 1741.

Wilhelm Heinrich acceded to the duchy of Saxe-Eisenach in 1729 upon the death of his father and was succeeded by his second cousin, duke Ernst August I of Saxe-Weimar. The personal union between Eisenach and Weimar created by this succession was only nominal until 1809, when the two patrimonies were formally united. He died in Eisenach.

References 

House of Wettin
1691 births
1741 deaths
People from Heerenveen
Dukes of Saxe-Eisenach